7th Heaven (also known as Seventh Heaven) is a 1927 American silent romantic drama directed by Frank Borzage, and starring Janet Gaynor and Charles Farrell. The film is based upon the 1922 play Seventh Heaven, by Austin Strong and was adapted for the screen by Benjamin Glazer. 7th Heaven was initially released as a standard silent film in May 1927. On September 10, 1927, Fox Film Corporation re-released the film with a synchronized Movietone soundtrack with a musical score and sound effects.

Upon its release, 7th Heaven was a critical and commercial success and helped to establish Fox Film Corporation as a major studio. It was one of the first of three films to be nominated for the Academy Award for Best Picture (then called "Outstanding Picture") at the 1st Academy Awards held on May 16, 1929. Janet Gaynor won the first Academy Award for Best Actress for her performance in the film (she also won for her performances in 1927's Sunrise: A Song of Two Humans and 1928's Street Angel). Director Frank Borzage also won the first Academy Award for Best Director while screenwriter Benjamin Glazer won the first Academy Award for Best Writing (Adapted Screenplay).

In 1995, 7th Heaven was selected for preservation in the United States National Film Registry by the Library of Congress as being "culturally, historically, or aesthetically significant". The film entered the public domain in the United States in 2023.

Plot

Chico works in the sewers of Paris. He dreams of becoming a street sweeper and therefore lights candles in the church. He also asks a blonde woman to be his partner. But his wishes are not granted, which makes him bitter.

One day Chico saves the young prostitute Diane, who is suffering from her unscrupulous sister Nana. The police want to arrest the prostitute, who is innocent in spite of her job, but Chico saves her by pretending to be her husband. Now the two have to maintain the facade and act as spouses. So Chico allows Diane to move into his attic with him. In fact, the two find each other. But when the war breaks out, Chico is called up. Diane works in an ammunition factory. News of Chico's death reaches her, but Chico is not dead. He returns home to Diane, wounded and blind.

Cast

Production notes

The Broadway play upon which the film is based starred George Gaul and Helen Menken and ran at the Booth Theatre for 704 performances.

When the play was adapted for the screen, Janet Gaynor and Charles Farrell were cast in the lead roles. The pairing proved to be so popular, the two went on to star in 11 more films together and were dubbed "America's Favorite Lovebirds".

7th Heaven features the song "Diane" by Ernö Rapée and Lew Pollack, who wrote the song specifically for the film. The song is included on the re-released version of the film.

Reception
7th Heaven initially premiered at the Carthay Circle Theatre in Los Angeles replacing another Fox melodrama What Price Glory?, which had been playing since November 1926. A second opening was held at the Sam H. Harris Theatre in New York City on May 25. Both openings earned a total of $14,500. A series of Movietone shorts featuring Ben Bernie and his Orchestra, Gertrude Lawrence, Raquel Meller, and Charles "Chic" Sale preceded the film.

Upon its release, 7th Heaven was a critical and commercial success. The New York Times critic stated that the film "grips your interest from the very beginning and even though the end is melodramatic you are glad that the sympathetic but self-satisfied Chico is brought back to his heart-broken Diane." The critic also praised Borzage's direction, stating that the director "has given it all that he could put through the medium of the camera." The film went on to play for 19 weeks in New York City and for 22 weeks in Los Angeles.

Due to the film's success and the success of other Fox films featuring sound elements (Sunrise, What Price Glory?), the studio re-released 7th Heaven with a synchronized Movietone soundtrack, including a musical score arranged by Ernö Rapée and sound effects. The re-release version premiered at New York City's Roxy Theatre on September 10, 1927.

By 1932, 7th Heaven had become the 13th-highest-grossing American silent, earning more than $2.5 million at the box office.

Awards and honors

Remakes and adaptations
A comparatively unknown 1937 remake of the film was produced as a sound feature starring Simone Simon, James Stewart, Jean Hersholt, and Gregory Ratoff, with Henry King directing. Unlike the 1927 version, the sound remake was not as financially successful.

7th Heaven was adapted for the Lux Radio Theatre four times: October 14, 1934, with Miriam Hopkins and John Boles (the show's premiere episode); October 17, 1938, with Jean Arthur and Don Ameche; October 16, 1944, with Jennifer Jones and Van Johnson (on the show's tenth-year anniversary); and finally on March 26, 1951, with Janet Gaynor and Charles Farrell, recreating their original roles.

A television adaptation was aired on October 26, 1953, on the anthology series Broadway Television Theatre. The episode stars Hurd Hatfield and Geraldine Brooks and was directed by Robert St. Aubrey.

On May 26, 1955, a stage musical version of the film opened at the ANTA Theatre starring Gloria DeHaven and Ricardo Montalbán. It closed on July 2, 1955, after 44 performances.

Home media
On December 9, 2008, 7th Heaven was included in the Murnau, Borzage and Fox DVD box set released by 20th Century Fox Home Entertainment.

In popular culture
Chinese writer-director Yuan Muzhi's 1937 film Street Angel has been cited as being influenced by elements of 7th Heaven and another Frank Borzage film Street Angel (1928).

The theatrical poster for 7th Heaven is displayed on the wall of the student Watanabe's lodgings in the oldest surviving film by the Japanese director Yasujirō Ozu, Days of Youth: A Student Romance (Gakusei Romansu: Wakaki Hi, 1929).

Filmmaker Damien Chazelle has said the ending of his 2016 musical La La Land was inspired by the ending of 7th Heaven.

References

References

External links

7th Heaven essay by Aubrey Solomon at National Film Registry
7th Heaven essay by Daniel Eagan in America's Film Legacy: The Authoritative Guide to the Landmark Movies in the National Film Registry, A&C Black, 2010 , pages 128-130 

7th Heaven at Virtual History

1927 films
1927 romantic drama films
American romantic drama films
American silent feature films
American black-and-white films
Fox Film films
American films based on plays
Films directed by Frank Borzage
Films featuring a Best Actress Academy Award-winning performance
Films produced by William Fox
Films set in Paris
Films set in the 1910s
Films whose director won the Best Directing Academy Award
Films whose writer won the Best Adapted Screenplay Academy Award
Films with screenplays by Benjamin Glazer
Films with screenplays by Bernard Vorhaus
Surviving American silent films
Transitional sound films
United States National Film Registry films
Films set on the French home front during World War I
Photoplay Awards film of the year winners
1920s American films
Silent romantic drama films
Silent war films
Silent American drama films